David Philip Farrington  (born 7 March 1944 in Ormskirk, Lancashire, England) is a British criminologist, forensic psychologist, and emeritus professor of psychological criminology at the University of Cambridge, where he is also a Leverhulme Trust Emeritus Fellow. In 2014, Paul Hawkins and Bitna Kim wrote that Farrington "is considered one of the leading psychologists and main contributors to the field of criminology in recent years."

Early life and education
Farrington was born in Ormskirk, England in 1944, the youngest son of William and Gladys Farrington. He was educated at Ormskirk Grammar School and later at Cambridge, where he received his BA, MA, and PhD in psychology.

Career
In 1969, Farrington became a research officer in criminology at the University of Cambridge, where he became assistant director of research in criminology in 1974 and a university lecturer in criminology in 1976. In 1992, he became a professor of psychological criminology at the University of Cambridge. From 1971 to 2000, he taught seminars and supervised undergraduate law students taking classes in crime prevention and the psychological aspects of crime, among other subjects. He was the director of the senior criminology course for criminal justice professionals at Cambridge from 1975 to 1978, and again from 1983 to 2004. From 1998 to 2016, he was an adjunct professor of psychiatry at the University of Pittsburgh's Western Psychiatric Institute and Clinic.

Research
Farrington is known for his research on the development of criminal behaviour throughout the life course; notably, he collaborated on the Cambridge Study in Delinquent Development with the study's original director, Donald J. West. This study followed 411 London boys born just before and after 1953, and was conducted over 24 years. He has also published studies comparing crime rates and the probability of imprisonment given conviction of a crime in the United Kingdom and the United States. He is also known for his work on evaluating the effectiveness of interventions intended to prevent crime, such as closed-circuit televisions. 

Farrington has also published on a number of related topics within the field of criminology, including crime and physical health; bullying; and offender profiling. He has authored eight systematic reviews for the Campbell Collaboration.

Honors and awards
In 2003, Farrington received an Order of the British Empire (OBE) for his services to criminology. In 2013, Farrington received the Stockholm Prize in Criminology for his work on early-life crime prevention programs. He has also received the Thorsten Sellin-Sheldon and Eleanor Glueck Award and the August Vollmer Award from the American Society of Criminology, the European Association of Psychology and Law's Award for Outstanding Career-Long Contributions to the Scientific Study of Law and Human Behaviour, the Joan McCord Award from the Academy of Experimental Criminology, and the Jerry Lee Award from the American Society of Criminology Division of Experimental Criminology.

Professional affiliations
Farrington has been president of the American Society of Criminology (1998–1999), the European Association of Psychology and Law (1997–1999), the British Society of Criminology (1990–1993), and the Academy of Experimental Criminology (2001–2003). In 1975, he became a member of the British Society of Criminology, and in 1999, he became a member of the Academy of Experimental Criminology. He is also a former member of the Academy of Criminal Justice Sciences (2004–2010) and International Society of Criminology (1998–2009). From 2015 to 2016, he was the chair of the American Society of Criminology's Division of Developmental and Life-Course Criminology.

Selected works

Articles

Books

References

External links
Faculty page

1944 births
Living people
British criminologists
British psychologists
Forensic psychologists
Academics of the University of Cambridge
Alumni of the University of Cambridge
Winners of the Stockholm Prize in Criminology
Presidents of the American Society of Criminology
People from Ormskirk
Officers of the Order of the British Empire